Skyboard can refer to:
 A Skyboard - A lightweight board similar to a snowboard, used for skysurfing.
 Skyboard (glider) - A one-person glider.
 Skyboard - A type of advertising hoarding; see Mobile billboard.